Beautiful Lumps of Coal is the third album by Christian singer Plumb. After undergoing many member changes, a record label change and marriage, Tiffany Arbuckle Lee decided to go solo. This release features the songs "Real", "Sink-N-Swim", "Free" and "Boys Don't Cry".

Track listing
 "Free" (Tiffany Arbuckle Lee, Matt Bronleewe) – 3:29
 "Sink N' Swim" (Lee, Jimmy Collins) – 3:29
 "Without You" (Lee, Jay Joyce) – 3:31
 "Boys Don't Cry" (Lee, Bronleewe) – 3:48
 "Hold Me" (Lee, Joyce) – 3:40
 "Walk Away" (Lee, Bronleewe) – 3:28
 "Taken" (Lee, Shaun Shankel, Kyle Jacobs) – 4:15
 "Nice Naïve and Beautiful" (Lee) – 4:15
 "Unnoticed" (Lee, Collins) – 3:08
 "Real" (Lee, Christa Wells) – 3:42
 "Love'em & Kiss'em" (Brandon Arbuckle) – 0:21
 "Go" (Lee, Wells) – 3:52

Singles
"Free" (2003)
"Sink N' Swim" (2004)
"Real" No. 30 Billboard Adult Top 40 (2004)

Chart performance

Cover
"Boys Don't Cry" was translated into French by Elsa Lunghini, as "Pour une vue du paradis", and released on her fifth studio album, De lave et de sève (2004).

References

2003 albums
Plumb (singer) albums
Curb Records albums
Albums produced by Jay Joyce